Pelourdea is an extinct genus of conifer. Species belonging to the genus lived from the Triassic to the Middle Jurassic and have been found in Europe and North America.

The attachments are spiral.

The lack of reproductive structures in known fossils have hindered determination of the taxonomy.

References 

Mesozoic plants
Pinales
Prehistoric gymnosperm genera